Sunwoo Jae-duk (born July 23, 1962) is a South Korean actor.

Filmography

Television series

Film

Variety show

Awards and nominations

References

External links 
 Sunwoo Jae-duk Fan Cafe at Daum 
 
 
 
 http://www.sghetti.com/ 

1962 births
Living people
20th-century South Korean male actors
21st-century South Korean male actors
South Korean male television actors
South Korean male film actors
Male actors from Seoul
South Korean television presenters
South Korean broadcasters
VJs (media personalities)
Seoul Institute of the Arts alumni
Seonu clan of Taiyuan